"The Cat Came Back" is a comic song written by Harry S. Miller in Christmas 1893. It has since entered the folk tradition and been recorded under variations of the title—"But the Cat Came Back", "And the Cat Came Back", etc. It is also a popular children's song.

Theme 
The song is humorous in nature, telling a silly tale about "ole Mister Johnson" who had an "ole yaller cat" that he did not want, and which kept coming back when he tried to get rid of it:

But the cat came back, he couldn't stay no long-er,
Yes the cat came back de very next day,
the cat came back—thought she were a goner,
But the cat came back for it wouldn't stay away.
Throughout the song, Mr. Johnson tries disposing of the animal in a variety of perilous ways. In one verse, he gives it to someone riding in a balloon, a trip that ends when the balloon drops far away with the person's whereabouts unknown. In another, a neighbor tries killing the cat with a shotgun loaded with nails and explosives, but accidentally blows himself up instead ("97 pieces of the man is all they found..."). Additional verses see Mr. Johnson handing the cat over to a man travelling west on a train that soon derails, killing everyone onboard except the cat; a little boy with a dollar riding up a river in his boat (which leads to the boy drowning and the river being dragged, while the cat, who had a rope tied around its neck, escapes unharmed), and a ship sailing across the ocean (an incoming gust of wind results in every person aboard dying, but the cat survives). One verse even reveals that the cat has its own family of seven kittens, until a cyclone destroys its home and the kittens are blown around, never to be seen again.

In Miller's original, the cat finally died when an organ grinder came around one day and:

De cat look'd around awhile an' kinder raised her head
When he played Ta-rah-dah-boom-da-rah, an' de cat dropped dead.

Even then the cat's ghost came back.

The first commercial recording of the song was ca. 1894 for the Columbia Phonograph Company, Washington D.C., performed by Charles Marsh. "The Cat Came Back" was later recorded by Fiddlin' John Carson (OKeh catalog #40119) in April 1924. Other early recordings include one by Dock Philipine "Fiddlin' Doc" Roberts ("And The Cat Came Back The Very Next Day", Gennett 3235), on November 13, 1925.

The original sheet music described the song as "A Comic Negro Absurdity" on the back page and provided an additional eight verses as well as a final chorus. A 1900 London edition of the sheet music described it as "A Nigger Absurdity" on the cover sheet.

Timing of the song
The song is often used to teach children the concepts of rhythm and tempo. It is an excellent example in this regard, especially the minor key versions of the song,  because of the strong and consistent beat pattern, combined with amusing and humorous lyrics.

Like many children's songs, the song has a strong well-defined beat pattern. It consists of one weak beat, one strong beat, so it is often sung in  time.  Thus it can be (and often is) sung while walking, with, for example, strong beats when the left foot hits the ground and weak beats when the right foot hits the ground.

Versions of the song
There are many versions of the song. One such variation goes something like:

first verse
Now old Mr. Johnson had troubles of his own,
He had a yellow cat that wouldn't leave his home,
He tried and he tried to give the cat away,
He gave it to a man going far away.

chorus
But the cat came back the very next day,
The cat came back, we thought he was a goner,
The cat came back, he just wouldn't stay away.

alternative chorus
But the cat came back he wouldn't stay away,
He was sitting on the porch the very next day.

Every second beat is emphasized (emphasized beats are shown underlined in bold).

Each line of text in the above has eight beats, and usually the chords fall (piano) or begin (organ) on the capitalized words.

The chord progression repeats every 8 beats, so one might think of the song as being in either 2/ time or 8/ time (whichever denominator is used for reference time, i.e. 2/4 or 8/4 time if the beat is a quarter note, etc.). The pattern of 2/ and 8/ is similar to the beat pattern in "Twinkle Twinkle Little Star", but phase-shifted by 180 degrees (since the song starts on a weak beat rather than the strong beat beginning of "Twinkle Twinkle").

A later version of the song emerged during the Cold War, in which the final verse made references to the "atom bomb" and "H-bomb", and the subsequent destruction of the human race.

Key
Many versions are in a major key, but there are some versions in a minor key.  The chord progression for many of the minor-key versions is Em, D, C, B.

Variations in the melody of the additional verses
The additional verses often have a notable variation in melody but with the same chords.
For example, the second verse often shoots up an octave to emphasize the words "dynamite" and "found" (each sung an octave above the first note of the song, which is "E" if the song is sung in the key of A-minor), even though the first verse does not shoot up that way

The third verse often contains a descending scale that does not appear in the first or second verses.

Microtonal and chirp-based versions of the chorus
Also, the second line of the chorus "thought he was a goner" is often sung either off-key (deliberately), or just spoken (not sung), or includes chirps or quarter tones (notes that fall between semitones). In some versions the chirps can be approximated by a chromatic glissando.

Bass line

Harmonic minor variations
The chord progression lends itself to a bass line that is natural minor descending, and harmonic minor ascending, i.e. in the key of A-minor, the 8 beats (in 8/ time) would play out as A, A, G, G, F, F, E, G♯.  This is practically the lament bass used in many chaconnes, e.g. Pachelbel's Chaconne in F minor.

Melodic minor variations
Additionally, the bass line may be played as melodic minor (i.e. including both an F♯ and a G♯ on the way up). This second variation is effective in teaching children the concept of a melodic minor scale, since melodic minor otherwise occurs so seldom in simple children's songs.

Cordell Barker's animated film

Although the Barker animation does not involve many spoken lyrics, relying more on its animation to show the action, both spoken verses, as shown here, are different than other versions:

Now, old Mr. Johnson had troubles of his own.
He had a yellow cat that wouldn't leave his home!
A special plan with deception as the key.
One little cat—how hard could it be?

and

Well, old Mr. Johnson had troubles of his own.
Still the yellow cat wouldn't leave his home!
Steps were needed to remove the little curse.
The old man knew it couldn't get any worse.

Popular culture
 The song helped launch the career of children's entertainer Fred Penner. He has used the song as part of a medley that includes the tune heard in "Hit the Road Jack" with lyrics changed to "Hit the Road Cat".
 The song was adapted in Afrikaans as "Die kat kom weer". The Afrikaans version had several references to the Boer War and British Imperialism.
 Randy Sparks reworked the song as "The Cat", for The New Christy Minstrels' 1963 album Tell Tall Tales!.
 The characters Randy Benton (Randy Boone) and Betsy Garth (Roberta Shore) sang "The Cat Came Back" on The Virginian in Season 3, Episode 10 "Return a Stranger" (November 18, 1964).
 Alex Hood, the Australian folk singer, recorded a version on his album The Wallaby Track (1974), with Australian references.
 Children's folk group Trout Fishing in America recorded "The Cat Came Back" on their 1991 album Big Trouble.
 The song features in the film Adaptation (2002).
 The song is mentioned in Pet Sematary by Stephen King.
 Children's entertainers Sharon, Lois & Bram recorded "The Cat Came Back" on their 1980 Juno Award-winning album Singing 'n' Swinging. They also featured the song on their hit Nickelodeon TV series The Elephant Show in Season 2, Episode 26 "Treasure Hunt".
 The song was used as the basis for the 1988 Oscar-nominated short animated film The Cat Came Back by Cordell Barker.
 The Cordell Barker film was the basis for a commercial for KP Snacks' Hula Hoops.
 An alternate adaptation of the song was performed by Rowlf the Dog with a banjo in The Muppet Show, episode 523, only having "the cat came back" as a common line in the chorus. The arrangement does not use the common contemporary descending musical structure, and substitutes "little Benny" for "old Mr. Johnson".
 An instrumental version of the song was released by the Canadian band Shadowy Men on a Shadowy Planet on their 1991 album Music For Pets.
 In a 1972 episode of the PBS program ZOOM, the children's cast (called ZOOMers) sang and danced to the song, although they did not sing all the verses because of its considerable length.
 A variation of the song, "Bitch Came Back", was written and performed by Canadian rock band Theory of a Deadman on their album The Truth Is....
 In 2011, a version from Fred Penner was featured in the film 388 Arletta Avenue.
 The song's lyrics are quoted in the Corner Gas episode "Cat River Daze".
The song’s lyrics are referenced in an episode of the television show Gilmore Girls, season 4 episode 10
Macabre Minstrels (a side project of the death metal/grindcore band Macabre) recorded a version on their 2002 EP Morbid Campfire Songs.
A character named Lolly briefly sang part of the song in a season 3 episode of Orange Is the New Black.
The song was covered by Laurie Berkner in 2007 and appeared in an episode of Jack's Big Music Show.

Translation
 French 
The song has been translated in 1970 by Steve Waring, a French-American author, under the title "Le matou revient" (a follow up song has even been written in 2008 by the same author). 
German 
The song has been translated in the late 1970s into a German dialect, spoken in southwestern Germany around Saarbrücken. Its punch line is political: After the fall of atomic and hydrogen bombs, the whole world decays, including the Saar region, but the cat survives.  Erich Steiner, university professor for Anglistics, is cited as translator by folk musician Jürgen Brill. Meanwhile, there exists another version in the similar dialect from Idar-Oberstein); here, the political statement has been removed.

References

External links
 Lyrical website with several versions
 A website with lyrics for popular children's songs includes this song.
 Watch full film The Cat Came Back at NFB.ca

English children's songs
Songs about cats
American folk songs
1893 songs
Public domain music